Manuripi-Heath Amazonian Wildlife National Reserve (Reserva Nacional de Vida Silvestre Amazónica Manuripi-Heath) is a protected area in the Pando Department, Bolivia, situated in the Manuripi Province and Madre de Dios Province.

External links 
 www.birdlife.org / Manuripi-Heath Amazonian Wildlife National Reserve (Spanish)

Protected areas of Bolivia
Geography of Pando Department
Protected areas established in 1973